Palpa District (a part of Lumbini Province, is one of the seventy-seven districts of Nepal, a landlocked country of South Asia.

Palpa District is not far from Pokhara and easily reached by bus. The ancient hill town of Tansen in this district offers a more tranquil atmosphere where laid back lifestyle is infectious. Walk down the cobbled streets in the old bazaar to discover a way of life. Explore the Shreenagar Hills or do a day hike to the Rani Mahal, once a vibrant palace on the banks of the Kali Gandaki River. Palpa was the seat of the Hindu Sen kingdom that ruled over this region from the 16th century for almost 300 years so Headquarter of Palpa is called "Tansen" (Nepali: तानसेन)

Geography and climate

Demographics
At the time of the 2011 Nepal census, Palpa District had a population of 261,180.

As their first language, 61.9% spoke Nepali, 34.3% Magar, 2.0% Newari, 0.6% Kumhali, 0.3% Bote, 0.2% Urdu, 0.1% Bhojpuri, 0.1% Hindi, 0.1% Tharu and 0.1% other languages.

Ethnicity/caste: 52.6% were Magar, 17.5% Hill Brahmin, 7.8% Chhetri, 6.7% Kami, 3.4% Newar, 3.2% Sarki, 2.6% Kumal, 1.9% Damai/Dholi, 1.4% Thakuri, 0.6% Gharti/Bhujel, 0.4% Musalman, 0.3% Bote, 0.3% other Dalit, 0.2% Gurung, 0.1% Badi, 0.1% Gaine, 0.1% Kathabaniyan, 0.1% Sanyasi/Dasnami, 0.1% Tharu and 0.2% others.

Religion: 90.5% were Hindu, 7.8% Buddhist, 0.9% Christian, 0.5% Muslim, 0.2% Prakriti and 0.1% others.

Literacy: 76.0% could read and write, 2.5% could only read and 21.4% could neither read nor write.

Local bodies

Tansen Municipality
Rampur, Palpa
Rainadevi Chhahara Rural Municipality
Ripdikot Rural Municipality
Bagnaskali Rural Municipality
Rambha Rural Municipality
Purbakhola Rural Municipality
Nisdi Rural Municipality
Mathagadi Rural Municipality
Tinahu Rural Municipality

Major rivers and khola
 Kali Gandaki River
 Tinau Khola
 Ridi Khola
 Purwa Khola
 Jhumsa Khola
 Dovan River
 Barabisse khola
 Dumre Khola

Major lakes

 Satyawati Lake (990m above sea level)
 Pravas Lake
 Sita Kunda

Gallery

Places of attraction
 Argali Palace was constructed by Juddha Shamsher
Forts like Kalika fort, Nuwakot fort, Bakumgadi Fort are historic place of attraction
Mahamritunjaya Statue of Lord Shiva situated at Barangdi which is the biggest in Asia among metal statue of Lord Shiva
 Ramdi is a religious place in the bank of Kali Gandaki River. On 1 Baisakh, there is a festival in this area.
 Ranighat Palace (Ranimahal) is also called Tajmahal of Nepal due to similar stories behind the construction of this palace. It was constructed by General Khadka for her wife Tejkumari in 1893 AD.
 Rishikesh Complex of Ruru Kshetra Hindu pilgrimage and cremation site
 Rishikesh Temple was built by the King Manimukunda Sen. According to Hindu mythology, this is the place where some part of body of Satidevei was cremated. It hosts a festival which occurs in 1st of Magh month when hidus come to take bath in Kali Gandaki River.
 Shrinagar Hill is spot for viewing high Himalayas. Dhawalagiri, Tukuche, Nilgiri, Annapurana, Himchuli and other mountains can be viewed from this place.
 Tansen is a historic city with palaces, temples, stupas and historic architecture.
 Vhairabsthan Temple is a Shiva temple with huge trident, believed to be largest in Asia.
 Madanpokhara is known its vegetable farmings and viewing great Madi Valley.

Villages
 

Satpokharee

See also
Lumbini Province
Rampur, Palpa

References

External links

UN map of VDC boundaries, water features and roads in Palpa
Palpa Nepal Information

 
Districts of Nepal established during Rana regime or before